Wojciech Alaborski (September 23, 1941 – April 5, 2009) was a Polish actor. He was born in Drohobycz and died in Warsaw.

Selected filmography
Pearl in the Crown (1972)
Nights and Days (1975)
Jaroslaw Dabrowski (1976)
Camouflage (1977)
Spiral (1978)
Operation Arsenal (1978)
Man of Iron (1981)
Pan Tadeusz: The Last Foray in Lithuania (1999)
Inferno Below (2003)

References

External links

1941 births
2009 deaths
Polish male stage actors
Polish male film actors
Polish male television actors
People from Drohobych
20th-century Polish male actors
21st-century Polish male actors